Villu Kõve (born 26 August 1971 in Orissaare) is an Estonian judge. Since on 4 February 2019, he is the Chief Justice of the Supreme Court of Estonia.

In 2009, he finished his PhD studies at the University of Tartu's Faculty of Law.

2014–2019, he worked as the Chairman of the Civil Chamber of the Supreme Court of Estonia.

References

Living people
1971 births
21st-century Estonian judges
University of Tartu alumni
Academic staff of the University of Tartu
University of Freiburg alumni
People from Orissaare